Hosta minor is a species of flowering plant in the Asparagaceae family. It is one of the smallest hostas. It is also known as Hosta sieboldii 'Alba'.

References

minor
Taxa named by John Gilbert Baker
Taxa named by Takenoshin Nakai